The Grob G 120 is a two-seat training and aerobatic low-wing aircraft with a carbon composite airframe, built by Grob Aircraft. It is based on the Grob G 115TA training aircraft and is specially designed for military and civil pilots training. It has a tricycle landing gear and a low tailplane.

Design and development
The airframe is made of carbon fibre reinforced plastic and is stressed to +6/-4g. Its minimum service life is just over 15,000 flight hours.

The cockpit provides room for students wearing military equipment and helmets. The plane is equipped with movable seats and rudder pedals and an air conditioning system. A second thrust lever is available.

Variants

Piston powered version with a Lycoming AEIO-540-D4D5 six cylinder, four-stroke, air-cooled piston aircraft engine producing .

G 120TP
Turboprop powered version with a Rolls-Royce 250-B17F aircraft engine producing  for take-off.

Operators

 KF Defence Programs: 14 for training of Canadian Armed Forces (until 2013) and Royal Canadian Air Force (from 2013) pilots.

 French Air and Space Force: 18

 German Air Force: 6

 Kenya Air Force: 6

Specifications (G 120A)

See also

References

 Grob G 115,120 and 140 Information brochure and Technical Datasheet (Grob Aerospace Sales Department, 2004)
 Jackson, Paul. Jane's All The World's Aircraft 2003–2004. Coulsdon, UK: Jane's Information Group, 2003. .

External links

 

1990s German sport aircraft
Grob aircraft
Single-engined tractor aircraft
Low-wing aircraft
Aircraft first flown in 1999